The Brutsche Freedom 210 STOL was a proposed American STOL homebuilt aircraft that was designed by Neal H. Brutsche and intended to be produced by Brutsche Aircraft Corporation of Salt Lake City, Utah, introduced in the mid-1990s. The aircraft was planned to be supplied as a kit for amateur construction.

Design and development
The Freedom 210 STOL was to be a follow-on design to the single-seat Brutsche Freedom 40. It features a cantilever high-wing, a four-seat enclosed cabin, fixed conventional landing gear with wheel pants and a single engine in tractor configuration.

The aircraft was to be made from aluminum sheet. The cabin width was to be , accessed via swing-up doors  in width. The acceptable power range was to be  and the standard engines used are the  Lycoming O-360 or the  fuel-injected Lycoming IO-360 powerplant. Kit options included a heater, upholstery, cargo tie-downs and floats.

With full fuel of  the payload for the pilot, passengers and baggage was to be .

The manufacturer estimated the construction time from the supplied kit would be 1400 hours.

Operational history
By 1998 the company reported that kits were available.

In April 2015 no examples had been registered in the United States with the Federal Aviation Administration and it is likely that none were completed.

Variants
Freedom 180 STOL
Version with  Lycoming O-360 engine and a length of 
Freedom 210 STOL
Version with  Lycoming IO-360 engine and a length of

Specifications (Freedom 210 STOL)

References

Freedom 210
1990s United States civil utility aircraft
Single-engined tractor aircraft
High-wing aircraft
Homebuilt aircraft